Saint-Cybardeaux is a commune in the Charente department in southwestern France.

Population

See also
Communes of the Charente department
List of Roman theatres

References

Communes of Charente
Charente communes articles needing translation from French Wikipedia